The Movement for Democracy and Independence (MDI) was a political party in the Central African Republic.

History
Established on 17 January 1981, the MDI was led by François Gueret, who had served in David Dacko's cabinet, but resigned. The MDI was fiercely anti-Soviet and somewhat pro-China. In the 1981 presidential elections the MDI nominated Gueret as its candidate, although he did not contest the elections.

The party was banned on 2 September 1981.

References

1981 disestablishments in the Central African Republic
1981 establishments in the Central African Republic
Defunct political parties in the Central African Republic
Political parties disestablished in 1981
Political parties established in 1981